Wire gate or wiregate may refer to:

 Hampshire gate
 A carabiner locking mechanism
 NSA warrantless surveillance (2001–2007), nicknamed "Wiregate"

See also 
 Wiergate, Texas